Dillon Township may refer to the following townships:
 Dillon Township, Tazewell County, Illinois 
 Dillon Township, Phelps County, Missouri

See also
 Dillon (disambiguation)

Township name disambiguation pages